George Pritchard  may refer to:

 George Pritchard (missionary) (1796–1883), British Christian missionary and diplomat in the South Pacific
 George M. Pritchard (1886–1955), North Carolina politician
 George H. Pritchard ( fl. 1910s), football coach